Mats G. Nilsson (born 1968 in Blekinge) is a Swedish politician of the Moderate Party. He was a member of the Riksdag from 2006 to 2010.

External links
Riksdagen: Mats G. Nilsson (m) 

Members of the Riksdag from the Moderate Party
Members of the Riksdag 2006–2010
Living people
1968 births
People from Blekinge
Date of birth missing (living people)